is a Japanese professional football club based in Hiratsuka, in the west of Kanagawa Prefecture, part of the Greater Tokyo Area. The club plays in the J1 League, which is the top tier of football in the country. Their home stadium is Hiratsuka Athletics Stadium. Shonan refers to a coastal area along Sagami Bay that includes Hiratsuka. Bellmare is a portmanteau of the Italian words bello and mare, meaning "beautiful sea".

History

Early years as corporate team
The club was founded in 1968 as Towa Real Estate SC in Nasu, Tochigi. They were promoted to the Japan Soccer League (JSL) Division 1 in 1972. They changed their name to Fujita Kogyo S.C. when Towa Estate Development gave up the ownership to their parent company Fujita Industries, which moved the club to Hiratsuka.

They won the JSL three times (including two doubles with the Emperor's Cup) between 1977 and 1981. They were nevertheless relegated to the JSL's Division 2 in 1990. Although they won the last JSL Division 2 season in 1991–92, the professionalization and formation of the J.League meant they did not meet the new top flight league's criteria and the runners-up, Kashima Antlers (formerly Sumitomo), were promoted instead.

1993: JFL
In 1993, they adopted new name Shonan Bellmare. Their application to the J.League Associate membership was accepted. They played in the former Japan Football League Division 1 and won the league championship. After Hiratsuka City Council committed to finance the refurbishment of the Hiratsuka Stadium to meet the J.League requirements, J.League accepted the club.

1994–1997: Golden era

The club was forced to change their name to Bellmare Hiratsuka because J.League required the participants to designate only one city or town as their hometown and include its name in the club names at that time. The club initially struggled to cope with the J.League opponents and finished 11th out of 12 in the first stage of the 1994 season. However, they came back in the second stage and finished 2nd. With this momentum, the club won the 1994–1995 Emperor's Cup. This title qualified Bellmare for the 1996 Asian Cup Winners' Cup, which they won by beating Iraq's Al Talaba in the final. Hidetoshi Nakata joined the team in 1995 and they also successfully recruited Brazilian-born Wagner Lopes and influential Korean international Hong Myung-bo. This is arguably the most successful period of the club.

1998–1999: Difficult period
Four Bellmare players were selected for the 1998 FIFA World Cup. They were Nakata, Lopes, Hong and a goalkeeper Nobuyuki Kojima. However, as Nakata left for Italian club Perugia just after the World Cup, the club's fortune started to decline. The main sponsor Fujita decided to discontinue the financial support in 1999 due to their own financial difficulties.  It forced the club to release some highly paid players including Lopes, Hong and Kojima. They finished bottom of J1 in 1999 and were relegated to J2.

2000–2009: J2
The club made a new start. The ownership was transferred to a community-owned organisation. They also changed their name to Shonan Bellmare as J.League allowed them to enlarge their designated hometowns to include several cities and towns surrounding Hiratsuka.  The club's performance on the pitch has not been strong and they have not been serious contenders for the promotion to J1 so far.

A J1 comeback in 2010, if they are able to achieve promotion, will be the first without Fujita as their sponsor. Although for a time they refused to consider their history as the championship-winning Fujita corporate team in their current history, this year they celebrated the club's 40-year anniversary in 2009 as deduced from the badge in their Web site.

On 5 December 2009, Shonan returned to J1 as third-place finishers in 2009 seasons.

2010–present: Return to J1
The club returned to the J1 in 2010, but injured one after another and J2 was relegated after leaving four games.
In the end, he won 21 consecutive league games. It was the worst record of J1 at that time.
After that, the team will be repeatedly demoted to J2 and promoted to J1.

In recent years, the team has been steadily emphasizing.
In 2014, the team made good progress in the J2, winning 14 consecutive games from the opening. The team was defeated by Ehime FC in the 15th round, but after that they lost 21 battles. J1 automatic promotion is confirmed. As a result, he won the J2 with 31 wins, 8 draws, 3 losses and 101 points in the 2014 season.
In 2016, in the J1, Shonan Bellmare was the final result in 8th place, and it was the first time for J1 to remain in history. In addition, at the EAFF E-1 Football Championship 2015 held in August, Wataru Endo, who was on the team at the time, participated as a representative of Japan.
In 2018, won the J.League Cup.  It was the first time for Shonan Bellmare to win three major titles since winning the 74th Emperor's Cup in the Bellmare Hiratsuka.

On the operational side, there was some report that the club fell into excess debt of more than 100 million yen in February 2012, and in the worst case the club itself could be dissolved (the actual amount of excess debt was 82.68 million yen). However, the debt insolvency was resolved by two capital increases. 
In April 2018, SANEI ARCHITECTURE PLANNING, which was the largest shareholder of Shonan Bellmare, established "Merudia RIZAP Shonan Sports Partners" in collaboration with RIZAP GROUP. The new company acquired a 50% stake in Shonan Bellmare. RIZAP GROUP intends to invest 1 billion yen in Bellmare over the next three years.

Colour, sponsors and manufacturers

Kit evolution

Rivalries 
Historically the Shonan area was part of a pre-modern province, Sagami Province, whereas Yokohama and Kawasaki were part of Musashi Province, hence Bellmare's intraprefectural rivalries with Yokohama F. Marinos, Yokohama FC and Kawasaki Frontale are based on the hard-working port cities of South Musashi as opposed to the more laid-back attitude of Sagami.

Record as J.League member 

Key

Honours

League

As Towa / Fujita (until 1992); Bellmare Hiratsuka (1993–1999); Shonan Bellmare (2000–present)
Japan Soccer League Division 1 (first tier):
Champions: 1977, 1979, 1981
Japan Soccer League Division 2/(old) Japan Football League Division 1/J.League Division 2 (second tier): 
Champions: 1991–92, 1993, 2014, 2017

Cup
Emperor's Cup: 1977, 1979, 1994
JSL Cup/J.League Cup: 1973, 2018
All Japan Senior Football Championship: 1971

Continental
Asian Cup Winners' Cup: 1995

Invitational
BTV Cup: 2016

League history

Kanto Football League: 1970–71
Division 1 (Japan Soccer League Div. 1): 1972–89 (1972–74 as Towa Real Estate Development; 1975–89 as Fujita Industries)
Division 2 (Japan Soccer League Div. 2): 1990–91 (as Fujita Industries)
Division 2 (Japan Football League (former) Div. 1): 1992–93 (as Fujita Industries)
Division 1 (J.League Div. 1): 1994–99 (as Bellmare Hiratsuka)
Division 2 (J.League Div. 2): 2000–09 (as Shonan Bellmare)
Division 1 (J.League Div. 1): 2010
Division 2 (J.League Div. 2): 2011–12
Division 1 (J.League Div. 1): 2013
Division 2 (J.League Div. 2): 2014
Division 1 (J1 League): 2015–16
Division 2 (J2 League): 2017
Division 1 (J1 League): 2018–

Total (as of 2017): 28 seasons in the top tier, 18 seasons in the second tier and 2 seasons in the Regional Leagues.

Players

Current squad

Type 2

Out on loan

Reserve squad (U-18s)

Management & support staff
For the 2023 season.

Manager history

Affiliated clubs
''The following clubs ars currently affiliated with Shonan Bellmare:
  Boeung Ket FC (2022–present) 
  Wuhan Three Towns FC (2022–present)
  Sudeva Delhi FC (2022–present) 
  FC Chanthabouly (2022–present) 
  Kelantan United FC (2022–present)
  Davao Aguilas FC (2022–present)
  Nongbua Pitchaya FC (2022–present)

See also
 Shonan Bellmare Futsal Club

References

External links
 Shonan Bellmare Official Web Site
 Shonan Bellmare Official Web Site

 
J.League clubs
Football clubs in Japan
Japan Soccer League clubs
Association football clubs established in 1968
Multi-sport clubs in Japan
Sports teams in Kanagawa Prefecture
Emperor's Cup winners
Japanese League Cup winners
1968 establishments in Japan
Japan Football League (1992–1998) clubs
Hiratsuka, Kanagawa
Asian Cup Winners Cup winning clubs